Saeed Mustafa (born 1 January 1986), also known as Saeed al-Saudi, is a Sudanese international footballer who plays as midfielder .

Mustafa plays club football. He scored his first goal for Al-Merreikh in the 50th minute  against Al Riffa of Bahrain in the Arab Champions League, which El-Merreikh won 1:3 in Manama.

Mustafa is a member of the Sudan national football team.

References

External links

Living people
Sudanese footballers
Sudan international footballers
Al-Merrikh SC players
Al-Ahly Shendi players
Al-Fayha FC players
Al-Hazem F.C. players
Damac FC players
Saudi First Division League players
Association football midfielders
1986 births